Estelle de Barescut (c. 1815 – c. 1852) was a French painter and lithographer. She exhibited her lithographs at the Salon de Paris in 1834 and 1835, and her paintings from 1842 to 1851.

Biography 
She was born Estelle-Félicité-Marie de Barescut (or de Barescut de Vernet). Sources differ on her place of birth, with some citing Versailles and others saying Paris.

She was a student of the École royale et gratuite de dessin pour les jeunes personnes de Paris in the 1820s, where in October 1829 she won a 2nd prize in drawing. She was later a student of Horace Vernet.

Works

Painting

Exhibited at the Salons 
 Portraits en pied des filles de Mme..., Salon of 1842

 Portrait de Mlle..., Salon of 1842 

 Portrait de de Mme d'..., Salon of 1843

 Tête de jeune fille, étude, Salon of 1843

 Une jeune châtelaine ; costume du moyen-âge, Salon of 1844

 Portraits des enfants de M. Davaux-Poirier, Salon of 1846

 Une lecture chez Anne d'Autriche, after Les Trois Mousquetaires of Alexandre Dumas, Salon of 1848

 Petite paysanne à la maraude, étude, Salon of 1848

 La Promenade, Salon of 1848

 La Fille du braconnier, Salon of 1848

 Tête de jeune fille, pastel, Salon of 1848

 Portrait en pied de Mme Lacomb, née Louise Courvoisier Salon of 1850

Others 
 Portrait de femme, undated, oil on canvas, Autun, musée Rolin, 985.12.2

 Portrait d'homme, undated, oil on canvas, musée Rolin, 985.12.3

 Sujet militaire, after Horace Vernet, undated, watercolour, former collection of François Depeaux

Lithography 

 Famille d'Ischia (Ile du Royaume de Naples), after Alexandre-Marie Colin, before 1830
 Les Petites Pêcheuses de Dunkerque, 1833 

 La Couronne de bluets (or bleuets), 1833, after Philippon, lithograph printed by Delaunois for Chaillou  

 L'Anxiété maternelle, Salon of 1834, After the work of the same name by Aimable Le Bot presented at the 1833 Salon, lithograph printed by Gihaut frères

 Album de six sujets peints par Mme Collin et Franquelin, 1834, lithographed album printed by Delaunois for Morlot; after Franquelin : Une Châtelaine infidèle, Une Scène de famille et La Catalanne [sic] à la fontaine; d'après Mme Collin : La Marchande alsacienne, Une scène de bal masqué and La leçon de chant. La Catalane à la fontaine and La Marchande alsacienne were presented at the 1834 Salon

 Six vues de Paris, lithographic album, Desesserts, 1834 : Notre Dame, Colonnade du Louvre, Château des Tuileries, St Germain L'Auxerrois, Hôtel de ville, Bourse et tribunal de commerce

 Eglise de la Madeleine, after Wnartz, printed by Delaunois for Desesserts, 1834

 Portrait d'enfant, Delannois, 1834

 La Veuve et le scellé, Salon of 1835;

Collections
Her work is included in the Wellcome Collection, the Musée Carnavalet, Paris and the Musée Rolin.

References 

19th-century French women artists
19th-century French painters
19th-century French lithographers
French engravers
Women lithographers